Peter Bocock (born 12 April 1991) is a New Zealand cricketer. He made his Twenty20 debut for Northern Districts on 27 December 2016 in the 2016–17 Super Smash. He made his List A debut for Northern Districts on 15 January 2017 in the 2016–17 Ford Trophy. He made his first-class debut for Northern Districts in the 2017–18 Plunket Shield season on 17 March 2018. In June 2018, he was awarded a contract with Northern Districts for the 2018–19 season.

References

External links
 

1991 births
Living people
New Zealand cricketers
Northern Districts cricketers
People from Te Awamutu
Cricketers from Waikato